"The Strange Case of Mr. Pelham" is a 1940 short story (later expanded in book form in 1957) by English writer Anthony Armstrong about a man involved in a serious car accident. The man recovers only to find himself being stalked by a seemingly identical version of himself. It was made into an episode of Alfred Hitchcock Presents which originally aired December 4, 1955, under the title "The Case of Mr. Pelham", and starring Tom Ewell as the victim of his own Doppelgänger.

The book was reprinted in 2021 by B7 Media, available on Amazon.

Adaptations 
The story was also made into the theatrical film The Man Who Haunted Himself in 1970 starring Roger Moore.  It was director Basil Dearden's last film, as he died soon afterwards in a car accident.

Critical reception 
Anthony Boucher commented on the novel as "a lightly amusing tale of suspense and terror and, read as fantasy, an attractive book"; Boucher, however, also quoted another reviewer who found that, reading the novel as a genre mystery, it was "an extraordinarily irritating piece of cleverness."

References

External links

1957 British novels
British thriller novels
English-language novels
British novels adapted into films
Methuen Publishing books